Chester County History Center (CCHC), formerly the Chester County Historical Society, is a nonprofit historical society, founded in 1893, dedicated to collecting, preserving, and exhibiting the history of Chester County, Pennsylvania, and the surrounding area. The History Center is located at 225 North High Street in downtown West Chester.

History
Dr. Robert Lukens served as the President of the Chester County History Center from 2011 until 2015. Lukens oversaw the renovations and beautification of the society's buildings and other facilities. He acquired state grants for the society and published a historical column in the Daily Local News.

Building
The History Center is a 56,000-square-foot complex that houses a museum and a library. It includes two connected buildings.

The older building, known as Horticultural Hall, was designed by architect Thomas U. Walter in 1848. It was the site of the 1852 Pennsylvania Women's Rights Convention. CCHC moved to the building in 1942 and modernized it in 1979.

In 1992, the adjacent YMCA building was incorporated into the complex. The library collection contains over 500,000 manuscripts, 80,000 photographs, and 20,000 volumes. The National Register of Historic Places named West Chester one of "America's Dozen Distinctive Destinations" in 2006.

See also 
List of historical societies
West Chester University
National Register of Historic Places listings in Chester County, Pennsylvania

References

External links 

 Official Web Site.

1893 establishments in Pennsylvania
Historical societies in Pennsylvania
History museums in Pennsylvania
West Chester, Pennsylvania
Thomas U. Walter buildings
Historic district contributing properties in Pennsylvania
National Register of Historic Places in Chester County, Pennsylvania
Museums in Chester County, Pennsylvania